Wayne Francis Clairmont (born July 5, 1943) is a Canadian former professional hockey player who played 511 games in the Eastern Hockey League for the Nashville Dixie Flyers.

External links
 

1943 births
Living people
Canadian ice hockey left wingers
Ice hockey people from Ontario
Nashville Dixie Flyers players
North American Hockey League (1973–1977) coaches
Sportspeople from Parry Sound, Ontario